Leucophlebia pinratanai is a moth of the family Sphingidae. It is found in  Thailand.

References

Leucophlebia
Moths described in 2003